Nasrallah v. Barr, 590 U.S. ___ (2020), was a United States Supreme Court case in which the Court ruled on the question of what appeals courts can review when determining whether a noncitizen who has committed a crime in the United States can be deported. It reversed the judgment of the U.S. Court of Appeals for the Eleventh Circuit.

References

External links
 

2020 in United States case law
United States immigration and naturalization case law
United States Supreme Court cases
United States Supreme Court cases of the Roberts Court